Laura Daniel (born 1990) is an actress and comedian from New Zealand. She currently reports on television show Seven Sharp. Previously, she has starred in the television series Funny Girls and Jono and Ben.  She has been in a relationship with fellow comedian Joseph Moore with whom she performs as the comedy duo Two Hearts. The couple were married in December 2022.

She has also worked on 7 Days. She was the voice of Riley in the animated television series The Barefoot Bandits and has performed in theater and musical theater productions. Daniel also sang "This Is For My Girls" with Teuila Blakely, Daisy Lawless, Lucy Lawless, Saraid Cameron, Kimberley Crossman, Kura Forrester, and Ilah Cooper. 

Daniel won series 2 of Taskmaster NZ in 2021. The same year she appeared on the panel show Patriot Brains.

In 2023, Daniel appeared on Guy Montgomery's Guy Mont-Spelling Bee.

References

External links
Auckland Actors profile and list of recent projects

Living people
New Zealand women comedians
1990 births